Yi County or Yixian is a county in the southeast of Anhui Province, People's Republic of China, under the jurisdiction of Huangshan City. The government of Yi County is located in Biyang Town. The villages of Xidi and Hongcun in Yi County are part of the World Heritage Sites.

Yi County has jurisdiction over three towns and nine townships.

History 
During the 16th century, Yi County flourished, and thousands of buildings in the style of Ming Dynasty were built. These buildings are used extensively by the Chinese film industry. Scenes from the well known film Crouching Tiger, Hidden Dragon (2000) were filmed in Yi County.

Administrative divisions
Yi County is divided to 3 towns and 9 townships.
Towns
Biyang
Jilian
Yuting

Townships

Climate

Transportation

Rail
Yi County is served by the Anhui–Jiangxi Railway, and has a station at Yuting, in the southern tip of the county.

Notable people
 Wang Dazhi, Chinese educator

References

External links

County-level divisions of Anhui
Huangshan City